SWAX is an album by American hip hop/breakbeat band Scapegoat Wax, released in 2002 by Hollywood Records.

Track listing
 "Back Alive"
 "Watching the Rain"
 "Lost Cause"
 "Crawlin'"
 "Freeway"
 "Bloodsweet"
 "Space to Share"
 "Eardrum"
 "Perfect Silence"
 "Aisle 10 (Hello Allison)"
 "Almost Fine"
 "Both My Friends"

References

Scapegoat Wax albums
2002 albums
Mammoth Records albums